The General Rules for the Interpretation of the Harmonized System ("GRI") are the rules that govern the classification of goods under the Harmonized Commodity Description and Coding System (HS).

Application 

There are 6 General Rules in all, which must be applied in consecutive order.

 GRI 1 prescribes how to classify products at the 4-digit Heading level, based on the wording of the headings and the relative HS Section and Chapter Notes.
 GRI 2 prescribes how to classify both incomplete and unassembled goods, and mixtures and combinations of goods.
 GRI 3 prescribes how to classify products that are, prima facie, classifiable under two different HS headings.
 GRI 4 prescribes how to classify products that cannot be classified according to GRI's 1, 2, and 3.
 GRI 5 prescribes how to classify packaging.
 GRI 6 prescribes how to classify products at the 6-digit subheading level, based on the wording of the subheadings and the relative HS Section and Chapter Notes.

External links 
Full Text of the General Rules for the Interpretation of the Harmonized System (World Customs Organization)
"What Every Member of the Trade Community Should Know About:Tariff Classification" (United States Customs and Border Protection)

Trade and industrial classification systems
Goods (economics)